Cyperus babakan is a species of sedge that is native to Asia, extending from south eastern parts of Tibet through to Papua New Guinea.

The species was first formally described by the botanist Ernst Gottlieb von Steudel in 1854.

See also
 List of Cyperus species

References

babakan
Plants described in 1854
Taxa named by Ernst Gottlieb von Steudel
Flora of Tibet
Flora of Papua New Guinea
Flora of Assam (region)
Flora of Bangladesh
Flora of Thailand 
Flora of Vietnam